Sheleg may refer to:

Bambi Sheleg (1958–2016), Israeli journalist 
Ehud Sheleg (born 1955), British-Israeli businessman
Sheleg Ba'sharav, 2012 studio album by Israeli singer Shiri Maimon
Sheleg, a type of Khazar-minted coin